Port Leon, Florida was a river port town located in what is now Wakulla County, Florida (at the time Leon County, Florida), which existed for only about six years in the first half of the 19th century. Port Leon is classified as an "extinct city" by the State Library and Archives of Florida and only remnants can be found today.

It, like neighboring St. Marks and Magnolia, was an important port for the cotton plantations of the Red Hills Region of Florida and Georgia.

The Tallahassee Railroad reached Port Leon in 1839. By then freight wagons and the railroad were bringing some 30,000 to 40,000 bales of cotton a year into the area ports. A bridge across the St. Marks River tied the port to the railroad and the docks for loading on ships, bound for the east coast of the United States.

Port Leon received a post office in 1840, and was incorporated in 1841. In the same year Port Leon, along with the other communities in the area, endured a severe yellow fever epidemic. On March 11, 1843, it was chosen as the seat of newly created Wakulla County. On September 13, 1843, a strong hurricane with a 10-foot (3 m) storm surge hit the area and destroyed Port Leon as well as heavily damaging nearby Magnolia and St. Marks. Port Leon was abandoned and many of its residents moved inland to the new town of Newport.

Port Leon had several hundred citizens at its peak with 8 to 10 businesses, some wharves, warehouses, a hotel, two taverns, a newspaper and an annual fair. One of the successful citizens was Daniel Ladd who had married into the Hamlin family from Maine that established the town of Magnolia.

Sources 

Port Leon - Ghost Town – accessed February 9, 2008

Former populated places in Wakulla County, Florida
Former county seats in Florida
Former municipalities in Florida
Ghost towns in Florida
Former populated places in Leon County, Florida